The only city in Afghanistan with over 1 million people is its capital, Kabul. The rest are smaller cities and towns. According to the National Statistic and Information Authority of Afghanistan (NSIA), an estimated total number of people living inside Afghanistan was 32,225,560 in 2020. Of this, around 7.8 million were reported to be living in urban areas and the rest in rural or countryside.

List
The chart below shows 18 cities of Afghanistan with a population over 100,000, by order of population.

Ancient names
Ancient names of places or cities in Afghanistan:

Gallery

See also
 Provinces of Afghanistan
 Districts of Afghanistan
 List of places in Afghanistan
 Demography of Afghanistan

References

External links

 Central Statistics Office of Afghanistan
 Photos of Afghan cities
 

 
 
Cities
Afghanistan